The Lycée International Alexandre Dumas (LIAD) is a French international school in Ben-Aknoun, Algiers, Algeria. It has two divisions: primaire (primary school) and collège-lycée (junior and senior high school).

A spin off of the school was inaugurated in the city of Oran on December 3, 2017. Another exists in Annaba.

See also

 Algeria–France relations

References

External links
  Lycée International Alexandre Dumas
  Lycée français d'Alger (Archive). French Senate, 9th Legislature.

Algiers
International schools in Algeria
Schools in Algiers
High schools in Algeria
Educational institutions established in 2002
2002 establishments in Algeria